LD (short for Liggett Ducat, the name of the original manufacturer) is a international brand of cigarettes, currently owned by Japan Tobacco. In the United States, it is manufactured in Turkey for JT International U.S.A.

History
LD was first launched in Russia in 1999 and quickly became Russia's number one cigarette brand and was rollout worldwide. Liggett Ducat was bought in 2000 by the Gallaher Group, which in turn was acquired by JTI in 2007. The original Liggett Ducat factory, where LD was manufactured, was shut down in 2016.

In 2016, JTI announced they would introduce the LD brand on the United States cigarette market with the Red, Silver, and Menthol (Green) varieties. The brand would become a discount brand and would have a $2.81-a-pack price tag. It aimed to challenge discount brands such as L&M which cost $3.69 and Pall Mall which cost $3.49. LD was introduced in North Carolina and South Carolina to act as a test market and, if successful, it would be launched nationwide in 2017 with 10 varieties.

Market
LD is sold across 54 markets across the world which include Russia, Bosnia and Herzegowina, Denmark, Austria, Poland, Hungary, Czech Republic, Croatia, Serbia, Estonia, Latvia, Lithuania, Malaysia, Egypt, Belarus, Ukraine, Azerbaijan, Montenegro, Kazakhstan, Kyrgyzstan, Bangladesh, Sudan, South Africa, Singapore, Romania, Israel, Mongolia, Montenegro, Taiwan, Canada, Jordan, Maldives, United States, México, Andorra,  Morocco.

See also

 Tobacco smoking
 Tobacco smoking
 Drina (cigarette)
 Elita (cigarette)
 Filter 57 (cigarette)
 Jadran (cigarette)
 Laika (cigarette)
 Lovćen (cigarette)
 Morava (cigarette)
 Partner (cigarette)
 Smart (cigarette)
 Time (cigarette)
 Sobranie
 Jin Ling
 Walter Wolf (cigarette)

References

Gallaher Group brands
Japan Tobacco brands